Leo Vargas (born in 2001 in Pachuca) is a Mexican professional squash player. As of December 2022, he was ranked number 171 in the world. He won the 2022 Anivesario cup.

References

2001 births
Living people
Mexican male squash players